The 1979 Eastern Michigan Hurons football team represented Eastern Michigan University in the 1979 NCAA Division I-A football season. In their second season under head coach Mike Stock, the Hurons compiled a 2–8–1 record (1–6–1 against conference opponents), finished in ninth place in the Mid-American Conference, and were outscored by their opponents, 236 to 113. The team's statistical leaders included Scott Davis with 1,744 passing yards, Doug Crisan with 412 rushing yards, and Tom Parm with 701 receiving yards.

Schedule

Roster

References

Eastern Michigan
Eastern Michigan Eagles football seasons
Eastern Michigan Hurons football